Anthology was released in 1993 and remains the biggest single Ben E. King album to date.  This two-disc collection spans 50 songs covering his entire career to this point.

16 songs on the album are not necessarily hits but are nonetheless included to provide insight on King's history.

Track listing

Disc 1
"There Goes My Baby" – 2:13
"Dance with Me" – 2:23
"This Magic Moment" – 2:29
"Lonely Winds" – 2:49
"Save the Last Dance for Me" – 2:29
"I Count the Tears" – 2:08
"Brace Yourself" – 2:09
"Show Me the Way" – 2:19
"Spanish Harlem" – 2:52
"First Taste of Love" – 2:21
"Young Boys Blues" – 2:17
"Stand by Me" – 3:00
"On the Horizon" – 2:19
"Here Comes the Night" – 2:25
"Amor" – 2:54
"Ecstasy" – 2:33
"Yes" – 3:04
"Walking in the Footsteps of a Fool" – 2:41
"Don't Play That Song (You Lied)" – 2:53
"How Can I Forget" – 2:20
"Gypsy" – 2:44
"I (Who Have Nothing)" – 2:28
"What Now My Love" – 2:39
"Groovin'" – 2:11
"That's When It Hurts" – 3:16
"Let the Water Run Down" – 2:35
"It's All Over" – 3:16

Disc 2
"River of Tears" – 2:27
"Seven Letters" – 2:52
"The Record (Baby I Love You)" – 2:34
"She's Gone Again" – 2:30
"Cry No More" – 2:56
"Goodnight My Love" – 2:40
"So Much Love" – 3:16
"I Swear by Stars Above" – 2:47
"What Is Soul" – 2:26
"A Man Without a Dream" – 3:03
"Tears Tears Tears" – 3:22
"We Got a Thing Going On" – 2:54
"Don't Take Your Love from Me" – 2:51
"It's Amazing" – 2:54
"Til I Can't Take It Anymore" – 3:12
"It Ain't Fair" – 2:44
"Hey Little One" – 2:46
"Supernatural Thing - Part I" – 3:22
"Do It in the Name of Love" – 3:34
"I Had a Love" – 3:38
"Get It Up for Love" – 3:50
"A Star in the Ghetto" – 3:53
"Music Trance" – 3:44

1993 greatest hits albums
Ben E. King compilation albums
Rhino Records compilation albums